Orest Klympush (born 14 February 1941) is a Ukrainian engineer, politician, diplomat. He is a son of Dmytro Klympush, the leader of Carpathian Sich formations of the Carpatho-Ukraine.

Personal life
Orest Klympush was born during the World War II on 14 February 1941 in Körösmező, Maramaros County (today, Yasinia, Rakhiv Raion). He graduated from the Kyiv Automobile and Highway Institute in 1964 and received his doctorate there in 1970.

In 1987-92 before being appointed the Minister of Transportation, Klympush was a director of the ministerial research institute, the State Automotive Transportation Research and Projection Institute.

See also
 Ministry of Infrastructure (Ukraine)
 Ivanna Klympush-Tsintsadze

References

External links
 Klympush at the Logos-Ukraine Publishing
 Klympush at the Confederation of Employers of Ukraine
 Klympush at the dovidka.com.ua

1941 births
Living people
People from Zakarpattia Oblast
Kiev National Transportation University alumni
Transport ministers of Ukraine
Ambassadors of Ukraine to Hungary
Ambassadors of Ukraine to Slovenia
Independent politicians in Ukraine
Revival (Ukraine) politicians
Second convocation members of the Verkhovna Rada
Fourth convocation members of the Verkhovna Rada